Lilou Wadoux-Ducellier (born 10 April 2001) is a French professional racing driver who currently races for Richard Mille AF Corse in the GTE Am class of the FIA World Endurance Championship. She is an Alpine Elf Europa Cup race winner, Renault Clio Cup podium finisher, and has previously competed in the TCR Europe Touring Car Series. Before signing for Ferrari as a factory driver in 2023, she raced in the WEC for Richard Mille's Signatech-run LMP2 team.

Career

Early career 
Though her father Cédric was briefly a rally driver, Wadoux spent her youth competing in tennis. She only started karting, mostly for fun, at the late age of 14. Aided by fellow Amiens racing drivers Julien and Florian Briché, she made the jump to competitive circuit racing two years later, in 2017. Starting out in the French lower-division one-make saloon car championships, Wadoux encountered success from early on, with an 8th place (runner-up in the junior class) in the Peugeot 208 Racing Cup followed by 3rd overall the following year. Her 2018 season also included four top-ten finishes from four guest starts in the superior Peugeot 308 Racing Cup, as well as an appearance in a two-day test organised by the FIA Women in Motorsport Commission in Navarra for 15 female racers.

2019 would see Wadoux make the step up to the TCR Europe Touring Car Series with a Peugeot 308 TCR from Briché's JSB Compétition team. However, her season was cut short due to a crash in the third round of the season at Spa-Francorchamps. She was hit by Qatari driver Abdullah Ali Al Khelaifi, who had lost control of his Cupra León TCR after an off at turn 16, and her car rolled several times before it finally came to a stop. She was unharmed, but the financial difficulties following the crash meant she was not able to return to the championship. She returned to racing in October that year, with a one-off appearance in the Clio Cup France at Circuit Paul Ricard that yielded a podium finish.

Alpine Elf Europa Cup 
In 2020, Wadoux switched to the one-make Alpine Elf Europa Cup, driving an Alpine A110 for Autosport GP. She had a consistent debut season, finishing all ten races in the top ten with eight junior podiums, but had to settle for 7th in the overall standings.

2021 would prove to be Wadoux's breakthrough year. Continuing in the Alpine Elf Europa Cup with Autosport GP, she finished eight of the 12 races on the overall podium and was part of a three-way title fight with reigning champion Jean-Baptiste Mela and single-seater graduate Ugo de Wilde that went down to the wire. She won one race at the season finale in Portimão and eventually finished third overall, second in the junior standings.

A highlight of Wadoux's 2021 season came at the Circuit de la Sarthe in August. Racing in the 24 Hours of Le Mans-supporting round of the Porsche Sprint Challenge France, in a car and circuit she was new to, Wadoux set pole position by a full three seconds and dominated the race from lights to flag.

Endurance racing 
In November 2021 Wadoux, as well as W Series drivers Jamie Chadwick and Alice Powell, was invited by the all-female LMP2 Richard Mille Racing Team to take part in the post-season FIA World Endurance Championship rookie test at Bahrain. She impressed the most, and was signed for the 2022 season as part of the team's switch to a mixed lineup, alongside ELMS champion Charles Milesi and WRC legend Sébastien Ogier. The trio completed the opening three rounds of the season together, ending with sixth place at the prestigious 24 Hours of Le Mans, before experienced LMP2 racer Paul-Loup Chatin took over from Ogier. Chatin served a mentoring role for Wadoux, guiding her during their time as teammates and also helping the team reach new heights. At the fourth round in Monza, the trio were running in third place with just over two hours to go when Prema's Robert Kubica lost control of his car into the first corner and sent Chatin into a spin. The incident damaged the Richard Mille car's gearbox, dropping the team from podium positions to outside the points. After eighth place in the final two events at Fuji and Bahrain, Wadoux and Milesi finished 12th in the standings with 30 points.

In late 2022, Wadoux was named as one of four drivers to be invited by the WEC to take part in the post-season rookie test at Bahrain. She drove the title-winning Hypercar, that being the Toyota GR010 Hybrid, and thus became the first woman to drive a top-class prototype since Vanina Ickx in 2011.

In 2023, the Frenchwoman made history by becoming the first ever female Ferrari factory driver. Moving over from prototypes to GT cars but remaining in the WEC, Wadoux signed for the Richard Mille-backed AF Corse team. She is set to race a Ferrari 488 GTE Evo in the LMGTE Am category alongside bronze-rated Luis Pérez Companc and fellow factory driver Alessio Rovera.

Personal life 
In her early teenage years before taking up racing, Wadoux competed in tennis. She says her idols are tennis player Rafael Nadal and Formula One world champion Ayrton Senna, whom his father, an amateur rally driver, admired in the 90s.

Racing record

Racing career summary 

† As Wadoux was a guest driver, she was ineligible to score points.
* Season still in progress.

Complete Alpine Elf Europa Cup results
(key) (Races in bold indicate pole position) (Races in italics indicate fastest lap)

Complete FIA World Endurance Championship results
(key) (Races in bold indicate pole position; races in italics indicate fastest lap)

* Season still in progress.

Complete 24 Hours of Le Mans results

References

External links 
 

Living people
2001 births
French racing drivers
French female racing drivers
Sportspeople from Amiens
FIA World Endurance Championship drivers
24 Hours of Le Mans drivers
Signature Team drivers
AF Corse drivers
Ferrari Competizioni GT drivers
TCR Europe Touring Car Series drivers